WPCT (channel 46) is a television station in Panama City Beach, Florida, United States, which 
broadcasts information for local tourists. Owned by Beach TV Properties, Inc., the station maintains transmitter facilities on Warner Avenue (off Front Beach Road) just east of Panama City Beach.

History 

The station was founded in 1987. It was originally the UPN affiliate for the Panama City market, airing tourist information during the overnight hours as well as carrying some syndicated talk shows, drama series, movies, and off-network sitcoms during the day outside of prime time network programming until 2001, when UPN was dropped in favor of 24-hour tourist info programming.

Technical information

Subchannels
The station's digital signal is multiplexed:

Analog-to-digital conversion
WPCT shut down its analog signal, over UHF channel 46, on February 17, 2009, the original target date in which full-power television stations in the United States were to transition from analog to digital broadcasts under federal mandate (which was later pushed back to June 12, 2009). The station's digital signal remained on its pre-transition UHF channel 47. Through the use of PSIP, digital television receivers display the station's virtual channel as its former UHF analog channel 46.

References

External links

Independent television stations in the United States
TrueReal affiliates
Defy TV affiliates
Scripps News affiliates
GetTV affiliates
Television channels and stations established in 1987
PCT
1987 establishments in Florida